Boxted is a village and civil parish in the Babergh district of Suffolk, England. From the 2011 Census the population was included in the civil parish of Somerton.

According to Eilert Ekwall, the meaning of the village name is place where box grow. The village is mentioned in the Domesday Book, at which time it had a population of 25.

Fenstead End

Fenstead End is a hamlet in the civil parish of Boxted, in the Babergh district, in the county of Suffolk, England.  The settlement appears in the Domesday Book as Finesteda when its inventory was:

Hundred — Babergh
Population — 4 households comprising 1 villager,  2 smallholders, 5 slaves.
Value — £5
Ploughland — 5 lord's plough teams
Meadow — 10 acres
Woodland — 20 pigs
Livestock in 1066 — 3 cattle, 1 horse
Lord in 1066 — Uhtred
Overlord in 1066 — Edgar of Houghton

References

Further reading

See also 
 Boxted Bombard

External links

Villages in Suffolk
Civil parishes in Suffolk
Babergh District